The SeaGlass Carousel is a fish-themed carousel in Battery Park at the southern tip of Manhattan Island in New York City. The carousel opened to the public on August 20, 2015.

The project to build a carousel was created by Warrie Price, founding president of the Battery Park Conservancy. City officials described the carousel's opening as a symbol of recovery in the area, which suffered damage from Hurricane Sandy in 2012. Part of a plan to redevelop the park, it cost $16 million to build; $8 million of this money was paid for by the city and the Lower Manhattan Development Corporation. A ride costs $5 and lasts for three-and-a-half minutes. Design and construction took nearly a decade.

The carousel is the work of New York architectural firm WXY and artist George Tsypin.  Music for the ride was created by Teddy Zambetti, a composer and music executive for SiriusXM, who adapted familiar classical themes by Debussy, Mozart, Prokofiev, Ravel, and Saint-Saëns into contemporary styles.  

The carousel features seating on identifiable species, such as a Siamese fighting fish. The carousel is designed to resemble an under-the-sea garden through which visitors ride on fish that appear to be made of sea glass and shimmer as though they were bioluminescent.  The effect refers not only to the carousel's waterfront site, but to nearby Castle Clinton, which housed the New York Aquarium from 1896 until 1941.  The design is also unusual for placing its operating machinery under the floor, so that there is no post in the center of the ride.  A designer from WXY Architecture stated of the carousel, "As far as we know, there’s nothing in the world like this".

References

External links

Carousels in New York (state)
Amusement rides introduced in 2015
2015 establishments in New York City
The Battery (Manhattan)